Nine Days that Changed the World is a 2010 documentary film produced by Newt Gingrich and his wife Callista that centers on the role played by Pope John Paul II in the fall of Communism in Europe and the rise of labour union Solidarity.

Notes

External links
 

2010 films
American documentary films
Films about Pope John Paul II
Newt Gingrich
Citizens United Productions films
2010s English-language films
2010s American films